Gulbenkian Prize is a series of prizes awarded annually by the Calouste Gulbenkian Foundation. The main Gulbenkian Prize was established in 1976 as the Gulbenkian Science Prize awarded to Portuguese individuals and organizations. 

Starting 2012, the Foundation started giving a special international Prize funded by an annual award of €100,000 each in the field of human rights called Calouste Gulbenkian Prize on Human Rights. 

The Gulbenkian Science Prize has now been restructured and is known as Gulbenkian Prizes on Cohesion, Knowledge and Sustainability and three prizes are awarded in each of the fields

Gulbenkian Science Prize

The Gulbenkian Science Prize (in Portuguese: Prémio Calouste Gulbenkian de Ciência e Tecnologia) established in 1976 is an annual award to Portuguese nationals or those whose work has been carried out in Portugal. From 2007 to 2011 it was given in four categories, awarded annually every four years: Basic Sciences (Mathematics and Computing Sciences); Physical Sciences; Life Sciences; and Social and Human Sciences. The prize was worth 50,000 Euros (previously €25,000). 

In 2011 a new prize (€100,000 for the first prize, €50,000 for the other four) was awarded for five disciplines: Intercultural and Environmental Dialogue; Arts; Science; Charity; and Education.

In 2017 three new categories were announced: Knowledge, Sustainability, and Cohesion, with prizes of €50,000 each. 

Past recipients include:

1986: Maria João Rodrigues
1987: António Freitas, Benedita Rocha, António Coutinho
1996: Boaventura de Sousa Santos 
1997: David Ish-Horowicz
1998: Ana Rute Neves
1999: Cristina Maria André de Pina e Sousa and Saůl António Gomes
2000:
2001: Gustavo Castelo Branco, Luís Manuel Lavoura and João Paulo F. da Silva: and Rui Loja Fernandes
2002: Patrício Silva and Pedro Gomes
2003: José Machado Pais
2004: Lorenzo Cornalba and Miguel Sousa da Costa; Sergey Dorogovtsev and José Fernando Ferreira Mendes; and José Francisco Rodrigues.
2005:
2006:
2007:
Arts category - Hand in Hand: Center for Jewish-Arab Education in Israel (€100,000); Ângelo de Sousa, Maria do Carmo Fonseca
Science category - Luís Barreira (€50,000)
Charity category -  Associação das Aldeias de Crianças SOS Portugal (€50,000)
Education category - Ar.Co (Centro de Arte e Comunicação Visual) (€50,000 each)
2008: Sérgio Rebelo
2009: Maria João Saraiva 
2010: Miguel Poiares Maduro
2011: Nuno Peres
2012-2018: See Human Rights section

Gulbenkian Prizes on Cohesion, Knowledge and Sustainability
Three annual awards given to individuals and non-profit private legal entities which have distinguished themselves in Portugal in the defence and promotion of Cohesion, Knowledge and Sustainability. Three annual awards are given one in each field of the categories of the prize
2017: 
Cohesion category - Artistic Musical Society of Pousos
Knowledge category - Portuguese Mathematics Society
Sustainability category - Association of Douro Valley Viticulture Development (ADVID)
2018: 
Cohesion category - É uma Casa, Lisboa Housing First
Knowledge category - O Espaço do Tempo
Sustainability category - Coopérnico Cooperative

Calouste Gulbenkian Prize on Human Rights
An international annual prize awarded to individuals and non-profit private legal entities which have distinguished themselves internationally in the defence and promotion of Human Rights on the issue of freedom of expression, information and press. Winners were:
2012: West–Eastern Divan Orchestra
2013: Bibliotheca Alexandrina - awarded to director Ismail Serageldin
2014: Community of Sant'Egidio
2015: Dr. Denis Mukwege (Congo)
2016: Amazonas Sustainable Foundation, in Portuguese The Amazonas Sustentável Foundation
2017: Hungarian Helsinki Committee / Professor Jane McAdam (Australia) - in ex-aequo
2018: Article 19
2019: Amin Maalouf

Gulbenkian Museum Prize

Known as the Gulbenkian Prize for the period 2003 to 2007, it was an annual prize awarded to a United Kingdom museum or gallery for a "track record of imagination, innovation and excellence". The Calouste Gulbenkian Foundation ended their sponsorship in 2007 and the award became the Art Fund Prize, and later Museum of the Year.

Other awards by the Calouste Gulbenkian Foundation

Vasco Vilalva Prize
Established in 2009, this is an annual prize of 50,000 euros, awarded to exemplary Portuguese projects displaying interventions in movable and immovable property of cultural value that stimulate the preservation and recovery of the heritage. The award is named after  (1913–1975), a Portuguese philanthropist and patron.

Branquinho da Fonseca Prize
The award is a literary prize that aims to encourage the emergence of young writers between the ages of 15 and 30.

Gulbenkian Prize for Humanity 
Established in 2020, the first €1-million Prize for Humanity was awarded in July 2020. It is aimed at distinguishing people or institutions fighting climate change.

Winners as Gulbenkian Prize for Humanity were:

2020: Greta Thunberg
2021: Global Covenant of Mayors for Climate & Energy

2022: IPBES and IPCC

References

External links
Calouste Gulbenkian Foundation -  Gulbenkian Prizes

Calouste Gulbenkian Foundation
Awards established in 1976